The Valz Prize (Prix Valz) was awarded by the French Academy of Sciences, from 1877 through 1970, to honor advances in astronomy.

History
The Valz Prize was established in June 1874 when the widow of astronomer Benjamin Valz, Marie Madeleine Julie Malhian, donated 10,000 francs to establish a prize in honor of her late husband. The Valz Prize was to be awarded for work of similar stature as that honored by the pre-existing Lalande Prize. The first Valz Prize was awarded in 1877 to brothers Paul and Prosper Henry, and was for the sum of 460 francs.

Save for 1924, the French Academy of Sciences awarded the Valz Prize annually from 1877 to 1943. After 1943, the prize was awarded only sporadically (only once per decade from 1950 to 1970). In 1970 the Valz Prize was combined with the Lalande Prize to create the Lalande-Valz Prize, which continued to be awarded through 1996. In 1997, that prize was combined with numerous other Academy prizes to create the Grande Médaille.

List of Valz Prize winners
 1877 – Paul Henry and Prosper Henry (joint award) – Charts to facilitate search for minor planets
 1878 – Julius Schmidt – Selenographic work
 1879 – Étienne Trouvelot – Work on Jupiter, Saturn, and Mars
 1880 – Wilhelm Tempel – Discovery of twenty comets
 1881 – David Gill – Work on the determination of the parallax of the Sun
 1882 – William Huggins – Applications of photography to the study of the spectra of celestial bodies
 1882 – Luiz Cruls – Spectral studies of the Great Comet of 1882
 1883 – Édouard Jean-Marie Stephan – Discoveries of nebulae
 1884 – Friedrich Karl Ginzel – Work on the eclipses of the Sun
 1885 – Friedrich Wilhelm Gustav Spörer – Work on sunspots
 1886 – Camille Guillaume Bigourdan – Research on the problem of personal error
 1887 – Ernest Perigaud – Investigation of the meridian instruments of the Paris Observatory
 1888 – Edward Charles Pickering – Photometric work on stellar magnitude
 1889 – Auguste Charlois – Astronomical work on orbits of seven asteroids
 1890 – S. de Glasenapp – Study on the double stars appearing in the Pulkovo Catalog
 1891 – Hermann Carl Vogel – Research in spectroscopy
 1892 – Pierre Puiseux – Entirety of his work, including that on the constant of aberration
 1893 – Adolf Berberich – Calculations of orbits of double stars, comets, and planets
 1894 – Jean Coniel – Calculations of asteroid orbits
 1895 – William Frederick Denning – Work on meteors and discoveries of comets
 1896 – Joseph Bossert – Catalog of 3,950 stars
 1897 – Louis Fabry – Research on orbits of comets
 1898 – Élie Colin – Research on astronomy and geodesy, especially latitude
 1899 – Magnus Nyrén – Sidereal astronomy and observations on the meridian
 1900 – Aloys Verschaffel – Meridian observations and catalog
 1901 – Charles André – Treatise on Traite d'Astronomie Stellaire
 1902 – Ernst Hartwig – Heliometer observations and work on variable stars
 1903 – Alphonse Borrelly – Discoveries of comets
 1904 – Campos Rodrigues – Determination of solar parallax by means of the asteroid Eros
 1905 – Michel Giacobini – discovery of ten comets
 1906 – Johann Palisa – Entirety of his astronomical research
 1907 – Michel Giacobini – Astronomical work
 1908 – Michel Luizet – Work on variable stars
 1909 – Aymar de la Baume Pluvinel – Entirety of his astronomical work
 1910 – Stéphane Javelle – Works on nebulae and comets
 1911 – Charlemagne Rambaud – Astronomical work
 1912 – Alexandre Schaumasse – Comet discoveries
 1913 – Alfred Fowler – Work on the principal series of hydrogen lines
 1914 – Pierre Salet – Research on polarization phenomena
 1914 – Stanislas Chevalier – Research on the Sun
 1915 – Armand Lambert – Work as an observer and in applied mathematics
 1916 – Giovanni Boccardi – Research on variation of latitude; discovery of a sensible inequality in the semi-lunar period
 1917 – Alexandre Schaumasse – Discovery of comet 1917b (C/1917 H1)
 1918 – Frédéric Sy – Entirety of his astronomical work
 1919 – Felix Boquet – Entirety of his scientific work
 1920 – Ernest Maubant – Calculation of perturbations of Tempel-Swift Comet
 1921 – Jean Trousset – Research on double stars, the errors of divided circles, and studies of Jupiter's moon, Pasiphae
 1922 – Jean François Chazy – Papers on the three-body problem
 1923 – Walter Sydney Adams – Work on Solar and stellar spectroscopy
 1924 – no award
 1925 – Vojislav Michkovitch (or Vojislav Mišković) – Work on Stellar statistics
 1926 – Frank Schlesinger – Astronomical work, especially for work on the stellar parallax
 1927 – Lucien d'Azambuja – Work on sunspots, solar flares, and the solar chromosphere
 1928 – George Van Biesbroeck – Entirety of his astronomical work
 1929 – Louis Dominique Joseph Armand Dunoyer de Segonzac – Research on spirit levels and on photoelectric cells
 1930 – Gilbert Rougier – Work on photoelectric cells
 1931 – Henri Chretien – Invention of the anamorphic lens
 1932 – Jean Dufay – Work on astronomical photometry
 1933 – Henri Labrouste – Research into periodic solar phenomena
 1934 – Ferdinand Quenisset – Observations on comets
 1935 – Raymond Tremblot – For the entirety of his astronomical work
 1936 – André Couder – Work on optical instruments
 1937 – Maurice Burgaud – Work in Shanghai, China on terrestrial magnetism
 1938 – Pierre Lacroute – Work in physical astronomy
 1938 – Rene Bernard – Work in "the light of the night sky"
 1940 – Jeanne Clavier – Work on a photographic map of the heavens
 1941 – Junior Gauzit – Research in physical astronomy
 1942 – Jean Rösch – Work in physical astronomy
 1943 – Rose Sainturier (née Rose Bonnet) – Work on double stars
 1944-1945 – Not awarded
 1946 – Raoul Goudey – Work on gravity
 1947-1948 – Not awarded
 1949 – Jean Delhaye – Work in stellar statistics
 1950-1958 – Not awarded
 1959 – Fernan Nahon – Work on stellar statistics and dynamics
 1960-1968 – Not awarded
 1969 – André Baranne – Work on optical astronomy
 1970 – Not awarded

Notes

See also

 List of astronomy awards

References

Awards of the French Academy of Sciences
Astronomy prizes
1874 establishments in France
Awards established in 1874